Joe or Joseph Byrd may refer to:

Alton Byrd (Joseph Alton Byrd; born 1957), American–British basketball player and team executive
Joe Byrd (Cherokee Nation Principal Chief) (born 1954)
Joe Byrd (vaudeville), vaudeville comedian
Joseph Byrd (born 1937), American musician.

See also
Joe Bird (disambiguation)
Joseph Birds (1887–1966), English footballer